The Sestra is a river in Moscow Oblast, Russia. It is a left tributary of the Dubna (Volga basin). Its source is the Senezh Lake. The river freezes in November to early January and stays under the ice until late March or April. Its main tributary is the Yakhroma. The town of Klin is located on the Sestra.

References 

Rivers of Moscow Oblast